Bernard Karrica (born 7 January 2001) is an Albanian professional footballer who plays as a winger for Slovenian club Gorica, on loan from Croatian club Rijeka.

Club career

Rijeka
On 28 June 2021, Karrica signed his first professional contract with Prva HNL side Rijeka. A month later, he was named as a Rijeka substitute for the first time in a league match against Istra 1961.

Loan at Sereď
On 9 September 2021, Karrica joined Slovak Super Liga side Sereď on a season-long loan, and was assigned squad number 32. Two days later, he made his debut in a 2–0 home win against Tatran Liptovský Mikuláš after coming on as a substitute in the 86th minute in place of Roko Jureškin.

References

External links

2001 births
Living people
Sportspeople from Gjakova
Albanian footballers
Albania youth international footballers
Albania under-21 international footballers
Albanian expatriate footballers
Albanian expatriate sportspeople in Croatia
Albanian expatriate sportspeople in Slovakia
Albanian expatriate sportspeople in Slovenia
Kosovan footballers
Kosovan expatriate footballers
Kosovan expatriate sportspeople in Croatia
Kosovan expatriate sportspeople in Slovakia
Kosovan expatriate sportspeople in Slovenia
Association football wingers
GNK Dinamo Zagreb II players
HNK Rijeka players
ŠKF Sereď players
NK Hrvatski Dragovoljac players
ND Gorica players
First Football League (Croatia) players
Croatian Football League players
Slovak Super Liga players
Slovenian PrvaLiga players
Expatriate footballers in Croatia
Expatriate footballers in Slovakia
Expatriate footballers in Slovenia